A Case at Law is a 1917 American silent western drama film directed by Arthur Rosson and starring Richard Rosson, Pauline Curley and Riley Hatch. The film's production was supervised by Allan Dwan.

Cast
 Richard Rosson as Jimmy Baggs 
 Pauline Curley as Mayme Saunders
 Riley Hatch as Dr. Saunders
 John T. Dillon as Saloonkeeper Art 
 Eddie Sturgis as The Lob

References

Bibliography
 Langman, Larry. A Guide to Silent Westerns. Greenwood Publishing Group, 1992.

External links
 

1917 films
1917 drama films
1910s English-language films
American silent feature films
Silent American drama films
American black-and-white films
Triangle Film Corporation films
Films directed by Arthur Rosson
1910s American films